The Twelves is an electronic music production and DJing duo, made up of Brazilian musicians João Miguel and Luciano Oliveira. They are best known for their remixing of songs by artists ranging from M.I.A. and La Roux to Nirvana and The Beatles. Spin dubbed them one of "9 Unknown Bands to Watch at SXSW" in March 2009 and one of the "25 Must-Hear Artists at Coachella 2011". They appeared on the Essential Mix on 19 Dec 2009.

Remixes

References

External links 
 The Twelves on Myspace
 The Twelves on Discogs

Electronic music duos
Brazilian electronic music groups
Brazilian house music groups
Brazilian DJs
Musical groups from Rio de Janeiro (city)
Musical groups established in 2005
2005 establishments in Brazil